Sushi Tadokoro is a Michelin Guide-starred Japanese restaurant in San Diego, California.

See also 

 List of Japanese restaurants
 List of Michelin starred restaurants in Los Angeles and Southern California

References 

Asian-American culture in San Diego
Japanese restaurants in California
Michelin Guide starred restaurants in California
Restaurants in San Diego